Beautiran (Gascon: Bautiran) is a commune in the Gironde department in southwestern France. Beautiran station has rail connections to Agen, Langon and Bordeaux.

Population

See also
Communes of the Gironde department

References

Communes of Gironde